Keith Collins (born September 3, 1976, in Passaic, New Jersey) is an American actor, filmmaker and advocate. He is best known for his work in The Meat Puppet, The Jersey Devil, The Evangelist, and The Samaritans.

Collins is a graduate of Clifton High School in New Jersey. He studied acting at New York City's School for Film and Television and graduated in 2004. The school would later change its name to The New York Conservatory for Dramatic Arts.

Career
Collins created, produced and acted in the 2012 thriller The Meat Puppet  released by Tomcat Films. Produced and acted in the 2015 comedy film The Jersey Devil  released by Shami Media Group. Created, produced and acted in the 2017 Psychological thriller The Evangelist 
released by Sony Pictures Home Entertainment in the U.S., eOne Entertainment in North America and ITN Distribution worldwide and Created, produced and acted in the 2019 Thriller / Suspense film The Samaritans  released by VIVA Pictures.

Collins has acted in many other films including The Coffee Shop, Stuck in the Middle, Gravedigger, Echelon 8, Billy Sample Reunion 108, The Great Fight, Games People Play:NY and has been featured on numerous TV shows such as Sex and the City and Guiding Light.

In 2015 Collins  was awarded the Creative Growth Lifesaver Award  at the Atlantic City Cinefest Film Festival  for his work and achievements in film.

Early life
While in New York, Collins was discovered by modeling agent Jan Gonet of Nytro Models. He would go on to have modeled for top designers such as Tommy Hilfiger, Calvin Klein, Ron Cheresken, Wilke Rodriguez, French Connection, Nike and was the face of the underwear line PLAY alongside Mayte Garcia.

Personal life
Keith Collins  was diagnosed with Tourette syndrome at a young age of 5. Collins who suffered in his early life from the disorder has been medication free since 13. Collins continues to raise awareness and has hosted numerous charity functions for Tourette syndrome.

Filmography

References

Notes

1976 births
Living people
American filmmakers
American male film actors